In Linnaean taxonomy, genus is the rank between family and species.

Genus may also refer to:

 Genus, a taxonomic rank used for the purpose of cloud classification
 Genus: Journal of Population Sciences, a journal of population genetics founded by Nora Federici
Genus (mathematics), a classifying property of a mathematical object
Genus of a multiplicative sequence
Geometric genus
In graph embedding, the genus of the graph is the genus of the surface in which it can be embedded
In the theory of numerical semigroups, the genus of a numerical semigroup is the cardinality of the set of gaps in the numerical semigroup
Genus of a quadratic form
Grammatical gender
Genus (music), a concept in ancient Greek music theory
Genus (philosophy)
Genus (linguistics)
Genus (comics), a furry erotic comic book
In Alienators: Evolution Continues, the Genus are monstrous alien organisms that have a high speed evolution
Genus plc, a British biotechnology company
Sport Club Genus de Porto Velho, a Brazilian football (soccer) club
Genera (operating system)

People
Gennadii Genus (born 1990), Ukrainian track cyclist
James Genus (born 1966), American jazz bassist
Sampson Genus (born 1988), American football player

See also
Gens (disambiguation)
Gender (disambiguation)
Genius